Big Sky is the first studio album by guitarist Brett Garsed, released in 2002 through Paranormal Records. The intro of the second track, "Trinity", contains a sample from the 1952 educational film Duck and Cover.

Track listing

Personnel
Brett Garsed – guitar, engineering, mixing, production
Toss Panos – drums
Ric Fierabracci – bass, engineering, mixing, production
Dave Schultz – mastering
Grit Frederick – executive production

References

Brett Garsed albums
2002 debut albums